Penpont Water (meaning river at the head of a bridge) is a small river in east Cornwall, United Kingdom. It is a  tributary of the River Inny joining it at Two Bridges.

References

Rivers of Cornwall
2Penpont